EAB may refer to:

 Abbs Airport, in Yemen
 American School of Brasília
 Eagle Atlantic Airlines, a defunct Ghanaian airline
 East African Breweries, a Kenyan holding company
 Emerald ash borer, a beetle
 Emergency Air Breather, used onboard U.S. submarines
 European Association for Biometrics, non-profit organization
 Esperanto Association of Britain, an educational charity
 European American Bank, now part of Citigroup
 Expert Action Badge, in the United States Army
 External Assessments Bureau, now the National Assessments Bureau, a New Zealand intelligence agency
 Hellenic Aerospace Industry, a Greek aerospace company
 EAB (company) formerly Education Advisory Board, a former division of The Advisory Board Company, an American consulting firm